The Knitting Factory is a nightclub in New York City that features eclectic music and entertainment. After opening in 1987, various other locations were opened in the United States.

The Knitting Factory gave its audience poetry readings, performance art, standup comedy, and musicians who transcended the usual boundaries of rock and jazz, often experimental music. The Knitting Factory owners distributed some performances to radio stations, and around 1990 starting a radio show and the record label Knitting Factory Works. Later the founders started Knitting Factory Records in 1998.

History

Founding in New York (1987)
It was founded by Michael Dorf and Louis Spitzer in 1987. The Knitting Factory was named by Dorf's and Spitzer's childhood friend Bob Appel and songwriter Jonathan Zarov, who derived the name through joking about Appel's experience working in an actual knitting factory. Appel, a lifelong musician, joined as a co-owner and co-manager soon after its founding. John Zorn was heavily associated with the creative direction of the club in its earliest years.

The original location was in Manhattan at 47 East Houston Street, near to CBGB and within walking distance of The Bottom Line. The venue was founded as an art gallery, with a performance space and cafe, as well as a home for experimental music.

Within a few years, the venue relocated to a new Manhattan location at 74 Leonard St, which featured a much larger main hall that generally showcased independent rock and pop music, and two smaller subterranean stages that were initially dedicated to avant garde music.

Since 1990, the Knitting Factory has sponsored the What is Jazz? Festival, a two-week long event in several locations in New York City. The event became so successful that its name was changed to the New York Jazz Festival. Knitting Factory Records was later founded in 1998.

New clubs outside New York (2000-2007)

Dorf opened a new club location in Los Angeles in 2000 under the parent company of Knitting Factory Entertainment, KnitMedia. Jared Hoffman, the founder of Instinct Records, which was acquired by Knitting Factory Entertainment in 2002, took over as CEO of the company from Dorf in 2004. In 2006 he oversaw the acquisition of concert promoters Bravo Entertainment and, in 2008, re-branded two of Bravo's clubs (one in Boise, Idaho, and another in Spokane, Washington) as Knitting Factory Concert Houses. Knitting Factory Presents then promoted a number of mainstream tours throughout the US.

In 2007 The Knitting Factory partnered with XM Satellite Radio to record and broadcast concerts from both Knitting Factory locations.

Ownership changes and move (2008)
Morgan Margolis took over as CEO in 2008. Hoffman left the company at the end of 2008.

In July 2008 the owners announced their move to close the Manhattan location and move to a much smaller space in Williamsburg, Brooklyn where it now stands at 361 Metropolitan Ave. At this new venue alternative comedy thrived, with many notable comedians gracing the stage including Hannibal Buress, Seth Herzog, Che Bridgett, Dan Ilic, and Pete Davidson. But they changed their minds and reopened the Tribeca location, and continued putting on shows with bands including The Shells, the Cro-Mags, and New Model Army (band). At that time, the New York and Hollywood locations held over 5,000 live performances each year.

Reno and closures (2009-present)
In July 2009 it was reported that the Los Angeles location was closing.

The last show in the Manhattan location however was on July 25, 2009, and was an event called Staff Infection in which staff took to the stage and said goodbye to its beloved club. The last band to play KFNY was 12,000 Trees featuring 3 Knit staffers. The new location was set to reopen in the new Brooklyn location in July 2009.

On September 9, 2009, The Knitting Factory relocated to the former space of the Luna Lounge — itself a Manhattan transplant — at 361 Metropolitan Avenue. This location, completely remodeled, is now in operation and has a capacity of about 300. The venue opened with a performance by Les Savy Fav.

In March 2016, the Knitting Factory announced it would be closing its Reno, Nevada location.

Knitting Factory Works

The Knitting Factory gave its audience poetry readings, performance art, standup comedy, and musicians who transcended the usual boundaries of rock and jazz, such as the Lounge Lizards, John Zorn, Dewey Redman, Don Byron, Anthony Braxton, and Cecil Taylor. The owners recorded some of these performances and distributed them to radio stations. They started a radio show in 1990 that was broadcast nationwide, and sometime between 1989 and 1990 a record label called Knitting Factory Works. In ten years the label issued over 200 albums that included music by Marilyn Crispell, Mark Dresser, Bill Ware, Roy Nathanson, Charles Gayle, Joe Morris, and Curtis Fowlkes.

See also

 Downtown music
 Knitting Factory Records
 List of record labels
 Noise Action Coalition

References

Further reading
Philippe Carles, André Clergeat, and Jean-Louis Comolli, Dictionnaire du jazz, Paris, 1994
For Knitting Factory, Westward Ho (Brooklyn, Too). New York Times

Music venues in California
Nightclubs in New York City
Nightclubs in California
1987 establishments in New York City
American record labels
Jazz record labels
Experimental music record labels
Drinking establishments in Manhattan
Companies based in New York City
Music venues completed in 1987